Olof Hanson (3 June 1882 – 4 June 1952) was a Liberal party member of the House of Commons of Canada. He was born in Tännäs, Sweden and became a businessman and lumberman.

He was first elected to Parliament at the Skeena riding in the 1930 general election then re-elected in 1935 and 1940. After  completing his third term, the 19th Canadian Parliament, Hanson did not seek re-election in 1945.

External links
 

1882 births
1952 deaths
Liberal Party of Canada MPs
Members of the House of Commons of Canada from British Columbia
Swedish expatriates in Canada